Didi and B. is an Australian children's television series airing on Nickelodeon Australia,and Nick Jr UK. Rather than animation, the show uses puppetry.

Plot
The series takes place in a magical garden and stars two insect hosts, Didi the butterfly and a bumblebee named B. The duo's goal is to help viewers learn and practice basic skills through games and songs.

Characters
Didi - Didi is an optimistic pink butterfly whose best friend is B. She lives in a mulberry tree.
B. - B. is a friendly "spelling bee" who resides in a mushroom house close to Didi's tree.

Episodes
Dazzle Day
Our Sandy Adventure
Sing-A-Longs
Play Along
Love Bugs
Rhyme Time
DIY with Didi
Colour in a Mulberry with Didi
Colour in an India with Didi
Colour in a Violet with Didi
Colour in an Eggplant with Didi
Colour in an Apple with Didi
Colour in a Topaz with Didi
Colour in a Sapphire with Didi
Just Joshing
Playdate
Goodnight
Days of the Week
Love, Love, Love, Love, Love
DIY Petal Portrait
Hide and Seek
DIY Miniature Garden
Songs with Didi and B.
Do a Salt Painting Yourself!
Do a Rain Painting Yourself!
Make a Pet Rock Yourself!
Make Your Own Foil Crown with Didi and B.
Letter B
Munchy Crunchy Lunch
Alphabet

Merchandise
The first Didi and B. merchandise to be released was a CD titled "Dazzle Day," featuring thirteen of the show's songs. There was also a Didi and B. DVD release featuring eight episodes.

References

External links
 
 Show-based application

2010s preschool education television series
Australian children's television series
Australian preschool education television series
Australian television shows featuring puppetry
English-language television shows
Nickelodeon (Australia and New Zealand) original programming
Television series about insects